The 3rd Generation Partnership Project 2 (3GPP2) is a collaboration between telecommunications associations to make a globally applicable third generation (3G) mobile phone system specification within the scope of the ITU's IMT-2000 project.  In practice, 3GPP2 is the standardization group for CDMA2000, the set of 3G standards based on the earlier cdmaOne 2G CDMA technology.

The participating associations are ARIB/TTC (Japan), China Communications Standards Association, Telecommunications Industry Association (North America) and Telecommunications Technology Association (South Korea).

The agreement was established in December 1998.

Ultra Mobile Broadband (UMB) was a 3GPP2 project to develop a fourth-generation successor to CDMA2000.  In November 2008, Qualcomm, UMB's lead sponsor, announced it was ending development of the technology, favoring LTE instead.

3GPP2 should not be confused with 3GPP; 3GPP is the standard body behind the Universal Mobile Telecommunications System (UMTS) that is the 3G upgrade to GSM networks, while 3GPP2 is the standard body behind the competing 3G standard CDMA2000 that is the 3G upgrade to cdmaOne networks used mostly in the United States (and to some extent also in Japan, China, Canada, South Korea and India).

GSM/UMTS were the most widespread 2G/3G wireless standards worldwide. Most countries used only the GSM family. A few countries, including China, the United States, Canada, Ukraine, Trinidad and Tobago, India, South Korea and Japan, used both sets of standards.

3GPP2 had its last activity in 2013, and the group has been dormant ever since.

References

External links
 3GPP2 Official Web site
 About 3GPP2
 TIA – U.S. 3GPP2 Standards Developer

3rd Generation Partnership Project 2 standards
Code division multiple access
Telecommunications organizations
1998 establishments in the United States
Companies established in 1998